Choh Hao Li (sometimes Cho Hao Li) (April 21, 1913 – November 28, 1987) was a Chinese-born American biochemist who discovered, in 1966, that human pituitary growth hormone (somatotropin) consists of a chain of 256 amino acids. In 1970 he succeeded in synthesizing this hormone, the largest protein molecule synthesized up to that time.

Li was born in Guangzhou and educated at the Nanjing University. In 1935 he immigrated to the US, where he took up postgraduate studies at the University of California, Berkeley and later joined the staff. He became professor in 1950. He served as Director of the Hormone Research Laboratory at Berkeley from 1950 to 1967 and at UCSF from 1967 until his retirement in 1983. In 1955 he was elected as Academician of Academia Sinica, Republic of China.

Li spent his entire academic career studying the pituitary-gland hormones. In collaboration with various co-workers, he isolated several protein hormones, including adrenocorticotropic hormone (ACTH), which stimulates the adrenal cortex to increase its secretion of corticoids. In 1956, Li and his group showed that ACTH consists of 39 amino acids arranged in a specific order, and that the whole chain of the natural hormone is not necessary for its action. He isolated another pituitary hormone called melanocyte-stimulating hormone (MSH) and found that not only does this hormone produce some effects similar to those produced by ACTH, but also that part of the amino acid chain of MSH is the same as that of ACTH.

Scientific Achievements 
In 1940, Dr. Li successfully purified the luteinizing hormone from sheep pituitary glands. The whole process included grinding thousands of glands, extracting the hormone, and then identifying its chemistry and biology at the molecular level. This was a breakthrough in biological studies.

Eight of the nine hormones secreted by the anterior pituitary were isolated and identified by Dr. Li and his research team. These nine hormones can be divided into three groups based on the similarity of their chemical properties and biological activities.

The first group includes adrenocorticotropic hormone (ACTH), melanocyte-stimulating hormones (MSH), and lipotropin.

1953 - Dr. Li being the first person to isolate and extract ACTH.

1964 - Dr. Li and his research team discovered and isolated lipotropin, and its structure was defined in 1965.

1975 - Dr. Li discovered β-endorphin when they were trying to find β-lipotropin in camel brain. The team isolated human β-endorphin in 1976 and synthesized it to study its biological activity after they defined the structure of  β-endorphin.

The second group includes follicle stimulating hormone (FSH), luteinizing hormone (LH), and thyroid stimulating hormone (TSH).

1974 - Dr. Li and his team sequenced human LH and TSH.

The third group includes growth hormone and prolactin.

1944 - Dr. Li was the first person to isolate growth hormone from cow brains. The lack of function of cow growth hormone on human body motivated Dr. Li to find human growth hormone.

1969 - Dr. Li discovered the complete primary structure of sheep prolactin.

1956 - Dr. Li successfully isolated human and monkey growth hormone and demonstrated its efficacy to treat hypopituitary children.

1970 - Dr. Li synthesized proteins with human growth hormone activity.

Awards 
Dr. Li is an expert in diversified areas, including endocrinology, biochemistry, and peptide synthesis. He not only was a widely recognized leader in pituitary-secreted research for his contribution in hormone and growth factors, but also greatly advanced the field of protein chemistry. All of his research had direct impact on clinical applications, especially in growth and fertility. It is estimated that he had published more than 1,000 research papers and had collaborated with more than 300 people. In addition, he was also the recipient of a lot of honors (more than 25). The most significant ones include:

1947 - the Ciba Award from the Endocrine Society

1951 - the Award of American Chemical Society

1955 - the Amory Prize of American Academy of Arts and Sciences

1962 - the first Albert Lasker Award for Basic Medical Research

1970 - the Scientific Achievement Award from American Medical Association

1971 - the National Award of the American Cancer Society

1972 -  the Nicholas Andry Award from the Association of Bone and Joint Surgeons

1977 -  the Lewis Price of the American Philosophical Society

1979 - the William H. Nichols Medal of the American Chemical Society

1981 - the Koch Award of the Endocrine Society

1987 -  the Alan E. Pierce Award (now R. Bruce Merrifield Award) from American Peptide Society

Dr. Li was elected 

1958 - Academician of Academia Sinica

1963 - Member of American Academy of Arts and Sciences

1973 - Member of United States National Academy of Sciences

1978 -  Foreign Member of Chilean Academy of Sciences

1984 - Foreign Member of Indian Institute of Science

10 Honorary Degrees 
1962 - Catholic University of Chile

1970 -  Chinese University of Hong Kong

1971 -  (the year the synthesis of Human Growth Hormone was announced)

 University of the Pacific
 Marquette University
 Saint Peter's College

1977 - University of Uppsala, Sweden

1978 - University of San Francisco 

1979 - Long Island University

1981 - University of Colorado

1982 - Medical College of Pennsylvania

The Establishment of Institute of Biological Chemistry, Academia Sinica 
Despite his significant scientific achievements, Dr. Li was also dedicated to the initiation and development of protein research in Taiwan. In spring 1958, Dr. Li was invited by Dr. Shih Hu to lecture a three-week course regarding the newly developed technology in protein chemistry and his latest pituitary gland research at National Taiwan University with the support from China Foundation for the Promotion of Education and Culture. At that time, the academic community only knew that protein research was developing rapidly abroad and a scholar had already made extraordinary achievements, and so when Dr. Li introduced the first-hand knowledge, it really attracted and inspired domestic scientists. Dr. Li believed that the protein chemistry was the foundation of future biochemical and biological sciences research, so he decided to assist the establishment of domestic protein research institute. In order to cultivate talents in Taiwan, Dr. Li personally provided scholarships and selected and persuaded scholars who have settled in Taiwan to continue the research in his or other research institutes. With the support from Academia Sinica, National Science Council, Ministry of Education, and National Taiwan University, Institute of Biological Chemistry and Institute of Biochemical Sciences, College of Life Science, National Taiwan University were established in 1972. The two institutes were originally located in the National Taiwan University's campus (Institutes of Biological Chemistry moved to Academia Sinica's campus later) to integrate research institutes and the University. Dr. Li had always been serving the chief consultant to assist the collaboration of the two institutes and international networking. The achievement of the two institutes today are built on Dr. Li's hard work. Dr. Li's foresight also brought about the domestic development of biotechnology and genetic engineering.

References

External links 
Institute of Biological Chemistry, Academia Sinica
Institute of Biochemical Sciences, National Taiwan University
Register of the Choh Hao Li Papers, 1937-1987, Online Archive of California
Li, Choh Hao, Social Networks and Archival Context
 Choh Hao Li Papers – University of California, San Francisco Library, Archives and Special Collections
 Biography and chronology
Forgotten Superheroes of Science and Medicine: Choh Hao Li
 History of UCSF biography
 Short biography
R. David Cole, "Choh Hao Li", Biographical Memoirs of the National Academy of Sciences (1996)

1913 births
1987 deaths
20th-century biologists
American biologists
Biologists from Guangdong
Chinese emigrants to the United States
Educators from Guangdong
Members of Academia Sinica
Nanjing University alumni
People from Panyu District
Recipients of the Albert Lasker Award for Basic Medical Research
University of California, Berkeley alumni
University of California, Berkeley College of Letters and Science faculty
University of Nanking alumni